A number of tugs have been named Egerton, including:

, a tug built in 1911, served with the Royal Navy in World War I
, a British tug in service 1947–61
, a diesel-powered tug in service 1965–90 (UK ON:306510)
, a diesel-powered tug in service since 1991 (IMO:7006144)

Ship names